Matt or Mat is a given name, often used as a nickname for Matthew. Less commonly, it is used as a surname.

Given name

Athletes
Matt Acton, Australian association football player
Matt Adams, American baseball player
Matt Ammendola (born 1996), American football player
Matt Araiza (born 2000), American football player
Matt Asiata, American football player
Matt Bahr, American football player
Matt Ballin, Australian rugby league player
Matt Barnes (disambiguation), multiple people
Matt Beaty, American baseball player
Matt Bentley, American professional wrestler
Matt Besler, American footballer
Matt Bessette, American mixed martial artist
Matt Biondi, swimmer
Matt Birk, American football player
Matt Blake, American baseball coach
Matt Blair, (1950–2020), American football player
Matt Borgschulte, American baseball coach
Matt Bradley, Canadian ice hockey player
Matt Bradley (American football), American football player
Matt Brash (disambiguation), multiple people
Matt Bryant, American football player
Matt Brennan (American football), American football player
Matt Bullard, former basketball player
Matt Burke (rugby union, born 1973), Australian rugby union player
Matt Buschmann (born 1984), American baseball player and coach
Matt Bush (disambiguation), multiple people
Matt Bushman (born 1995), American football player
Matt Cain, American baseball player
Matt Carpenter (baseball), American baseball player
Matt Carroll (basketball) , American basketball player
Matt Cassel, American football player
Matt Cavanaugh, American football player
Matt Chapman, American baseball player
Matt Coates, Canadian football player
Matt Cole (born 1996), American football player
Matt Cook (ice sledge hockey) (1987–2010), Canadian ice sledge hockey player
Matt Cook (rugby league) (born 1986), English rugby union and rugby league footballer
Matt Cooke, Canadian ice hockey player
Matt Corral (born 1999), American football player
Matt Crafton, American racecar driver
Matt Davidson (baseball), American baseball player
Mat Dawson (born 1972), English retired rugby union player
Matt Dermody, American baseball player
Matt DiBenedetto, American race car driver
Matt Dickerson, American football player
Matt Duchene, Canadian hockey player
Matt Duffie, New Zealand rugby union footballer
Matt Duffy (born 1991), American baseball player
Matt Duffy (baseball, born 1989), American baseball player
Matt Dunigan, Canadian Football league 
Matt Elliott (footballer), Scottish footballer
Matt Entz, American football coach 
Matt Erickson (born 1975), American baseball player and coach
Matt Farniok (born 1997), American football player
Matt Feiler, American football player
Matt Fish, basketball player
Matt Flanagan (American football) (born 1995), American football player
Matt Flynn, American football player
Matt Forte, American football player
Matt Foster, American baseball player
Matt Gage, American baseball player
Matt Garza, American baseball player
Matt Gay (born 1994), American football player
Matt Gillett, Australian rugby league player
Matt Giteau, Australian rugby union footballer
Matt Gono (born 1996), American football player
Matt Hamilton (curler), American curler
Matt Hanousek, American football player
Matt Hardy, American professional wrestler
Matt Harvey, American baseball player
Matt Hasselbeck, American football player
Matt Hayden, professional cricketer
Matt Hazeltine, American football player
Matt Hedges, American footballer
Matt Hennessy (born 1997), American football player
Matt Henningsen (born 1999), American football player
Matt Hernandez, American football player
Mat Hoffman (born 1972), American BMX rider
Matt Holland, footballer
Matt Holliday, American baseball player
Matt Hughes (fighter), mixed martial artist
Matt Jones (basketball) (born 1994), American basketball player
Matt Jones (Australian footballer) (born 1987), Australian rules footballer
Matt Jones (footballer, born 1980), Welsh international football player
Matt Jones (footballer, born 1986),  English football goalkeeper for Belenenses
Matt Jones (golfer) (born 1980), Australian professional golfer
Matt Jones (ice hockey) (born 1983), American ice hockey defenseman
Matt Jones (rugby union) (born 1984), Welsh international rugby union player
Matt Jones (running back) (born 1993), American football running back
Matt Jones (wide receiver) (born 1983), American football wide receiver
Matt Kalil (born 1989), American football
Matt Kaskey (born 1997), American football player
Matt Kemp, American baseball player
Matt Kenseth, 2003 NASCAR Winston Cup Champion
Matt Kilroy, American baseball player
Matt Koch, American baseball player
Matt Kohn, American football player
Matt LaFleur, American Football Coach 
Mat Latos (born 1987), American Major League Baseball pitcher
Matt Lee, Canadian professional wrestler, better known as Shane Matthews
Matt Leinart (born 1983), American football player
Matt Leo (born 1992), Australian-American football player
Matt Lentz (born 1982), American football player
Matt Le Tissier, former English International association football player
Matt Light, (born 1978), American football 
Matt Lloyd (footballer), Australian rules footballer
Matt Lloyd (Paralympian) (born 1972), British ice sledge hockey Paralympian
Matt Manning (born 1998), American baseball player
Matt Manning (rugby league) (born 1974), Australian rugby league footballer
Matt McCrane (born 1994), American football player
Matt McGloin (born 1989), American football player
Mat Mendenhall (born 1957), American former National Football League player
Matt Mervis (born 1998), American baseball player
Matt Milano (born 1994), American football player
Matt Millen (born 1958), American Football player
Matt Moore (disambiguation), several people
Matt Morgan (wrestler), American professional wrestler
Matt Morris (baseball), retired baseball player
Matt Moylan, Australian rugby league player
Matt Mullins, American martial artist
Matt Murray (ice hockey, born 1994), Ice Hockey 
Matt Nagy, American football player
Matt Neal a British touring car driver
Matt Olson, American baseball player
Matt Orzech (born 1995), American football player
Matt Osborne, professional wrestler
Matt Patricia, American football coach 
Matt Peacock (disambiguation), multiple people
Matt Peart (born 1997), Jamaican-American football player
Matt Perry (rugby player), English rugby union footballer
Matt Postle, Welsh racing cyclist
Matt Prater, American football player
Matt Prince, a.k.a. Wifebeater, American professional wrestler
Matt Pryor (American football) (born 1994), American football player
Matt Quatraro (born 1973), American baseball coach
Mat Rebeaud (born 1982), Swiss freestyle motocross rider
Matt Reiswerg (born 1980), American soccer player, coach, and administrator
Matt Reynolds (American football) (born 1986), American football player
Matt Reynolds (baseball coach), American college baseball coach
Matt Reynolds (infielder) (born 1990), American baseball player
Matt Reynolds (pitcher) (born 1984), American baseball player
Matt Rhule (born 1975), American football coach 
Mat Robinson (born 1986), Canadian ice hockey player
Matt Robinson (American football) (born 1956), American football player
Matt Robinson (footballer, born 1907) (1907–1987), English football player
Matt Robinson (footballer, born 1993), English football player
Matt Robinson (rugby league) (born 1990), New Zealand rugby league player
Mat Rogers (born 1976), Australian former rugby league footballer
Matt Ruff (born 1990), Football player
Matt Ryan (American football), American football player
Matt Scoggin, American diver
Matt Schaub, American football player
 Matt Simms (American football) (born 1988), American football player
Matt Snell (born 1941), American football player
Matt Sokol (born 1995), American football player
Matt Stairs (born 1968), baseball player
Matt Stajan, ice hockey player
Matt Stover, American former football player
Matt Strahm, American baseball player
Matt Swarmer, American baseball player
Matt Thaiss, American baseball player
Mat Toshack (born 1973), Australian former rugby league footballer
Matt Turk, American football player 
Matt Vierling, American baseball player
Matt Vogler, American football player
Matt Waletzko (born 1999), American football player
Matt Wallner, American baseball player
Matt Ward (lacrosse player), American lacrosse player
Matt Wieters, American baseball player
Matt Williams (third baseman), American baseball player
Matt Wise (born 1975), American baseball player and coach
Matt Wisler, American baseball player

Musicians
 Matt Bellamy, guitarist, pianist and lead singer of Muse
 Matt Berninger, frontman and lead singer of The National
 Matt Bettinelli-Olpin, original guitar player and co-songwriter for influential punk/ska band Link 80
 Matt Cameron, former Soundgarden drummer and current drummer of Pearl Jam
 Matt Champion (born 1995), member of boy band Brockhampton
 Matt Costa, singer/songwriter from Hungtington Beach, California
 Matt Freeman, bassist for the bands Operation Ivy and Rancid
 Matt Garstka, drummer for metal band Animals as Leaders
 Matt Helders, drummer for the Arctic Monkeys
 Matt Heafy, vocalist and guitarist for the metal bands Trivium and Capharnaum
 Matty Healy, vocalist and frontman of English pop rock band The 1975
 Matt Hoopes, lead guitarist for the band Relient K
 Matt Houston (singer), French R&B singer and music producer originating from Guadeloupe (aka Matt)
 Matt Hunter (singer) (born 1998), American Latin-influenced pop singer, now known as Matt Hunter Correa
 Matt Johnson (singer), founder and only constant member of multimedia band The The
 Mat Kearney (born 1978), American singer-songwriter and musician
 Matthew Lewin, producer and member of American synthpop group Magdalena Bay
 Matt Maher, Canadian contemporary Christian music artist, songwriter, and worship leader
 Matt Maeson, American singer-songwriter
 Matt Maltese, English singer-songwriter
 Matt Monro, British singer
 Mat Osman (born 1967), English musician, bassist of the rock band Suede
 Matt Redman (born 1974), English musician
 Matt Shadows, vocalist for band Avenged Sevenfold
 Matt Sharp, former member of the rock band Weezer
 Matt Simmonds, demoscene musician
 Matt Slocum, former member of Sixpence None the Richer and composer of "Kiss Me"
 Matt Sorum, hard rock drummer and percussionist
 Matt Traynor, former metalcore drummer of Blessthefall
 Matt Tuck, metal singer for the band Bullet For My Valentine 
 M. Ward, singer-songwriter and guitarist

Actors 
 Mat Baynton (born 1980), British actor and musician
Matt Bennett (born 1991), American actor
Matt Berry (born 1974), British actor and musician
 Matt Bomer (born 1977), American actor
 Matt Cohen (actor) (born 1982), American actor
 Matt Czuchry (born 1977), American actor
 Matt Dallas (born 1982), American actor
 Matt Damon (born 1970), American actor
 Matt Dillon (born 1964), American actor
 Mat Fraser (fl. 1980s-present), English actor
 Matt Hobby (born 1985), American actor and comedian
 Matt L. Jones (born 1981), American actor and comedian
 Matt Lanter (born 1983), American actor
 Matt LeBlanc (born 1967), American actor
 Matt Lintz (born 2001), American actor
 Matt McCooey (born 1981), English-Japanese actor
 Matt Murray (actor) (born 1989), American actor
 Matt Newton (born 1977), American actor 
 Matt Prokop (born 1990), American actor
 Matt Robinson (actor) (1937–2002), American actor
 Matt Ryan (actor) (born 1981), Welsh actor
 Matt Shipman, American voice actor
 Matt Shively (born 1990), American actor
 Matt Smith (actor) (born 1982), English actor
 Matt Stone (born 1971), American actor
 Mat Stevenson (born 1969), Australian actor
 Matt Zimmerman (actor) (1934–2022), Canadian actor
 Matt Walsh (comedian) (born 1964), American comedian and actor

Politicians 
 Matt Bevin (born 1967), American politician
 Matt Blunt (born 1970), American politician and former naval officer
 Matt Cartwright (born 1961), American politician 
 Mat Erpelding (born 1975), American politician
 Matt Gaetz (born 1982), American politician 
 Matt Gonzalez, Green Party politician
 Matt Jones (American politician), American politician
 Matt Lesser, American politician
 Matt Mead (born 1962), American politician and attorney

Writers, journalists and editors 
 Matt Barbet, journalist
 Matt Bruenig (born 1988), American political commentator
 Matt Boyd (writer), writer of the webcomics Mac Hall and Three Panel Soul
 Matt Casamassina, editor for the website IGN
 Matt Cohen (writer), writer
 Matt Hongoltz-Hetling, American journalist
 Matt Jones (writer) (born 1968), British television writer and television producer
 Matt Lauer, television journalist
 Matt Robinson (poet) (born 1974), Canadian poet
 Matt Walsh (political commentator) (born 1986), American right-wing political commentator and author

Other 
 Matt Allwright, British television presenter
 Matt Clark (baseball) (born 1986), American professional baseball player
 Mat Collishaw (born 1966), English photographic and video artist
 Matt Cook (historian), Birkbeck College professor
 Mat Franco (born 1988), American magician and winner of the ninth season of America's Got Talent
 Matt Groening, best known as the creator of The Simpsons and Futurama
 Matt Harding, Internet celebrity better known as "Dancing Matt"
 Matt Harvey (born 1989), American professional baseball player
 Matt Iseman, American comedian and host of American Ninja Warrior since Season 2
 Matt Jones (interaction designer) (born 1968), active researcher and organizer of scientific conferences
 Matt Kemp (born 1984), American professional baseball player
 Mat Kirkby, English filmmaker, winner of the 2015 Academy Award for Best Live Action Short Film
 Matt Klentak (born 1980), American professional baseball executive
 Matt Kuwata, also known as Matt Rose, (born 1994), Japanese tarento, model, and musician
 Matt Lucas (born 1974), British comedian, best known for Little Britain 
 Matt Mullenweg (born 1984), cofounder of WordPress and CEO of Automattic
 Matt Moore (baseball) (born 1989), American professional baseball player
 Matt Morgan (comedian), comedian and comedy writer
 Matt Nelson (disambiguation), multiple people
 Matt Pritchett, cartoonist in the UK Daily Telegraph
 Matt Sauer (born 1999), American professional baseball player
 Matt Taylor (scientist), project scientist for the Rosetta mission
 Matt West, choreographer
 Matt West (baseball), American professional baseball player

Fictional characters
Matt the Radar Technician, one-time Saturday Night Live character played by Adam Driver
Matrim "Mat" Cauthon, a character in the Wheel of Time fantasy series
Matt Del Marco, a character in the Netflix series  Grand Army
Matt Foley, Saturday Night Live parody character
Matt Horner, in the StarCraft franchise
Matt (Death Note) (real name: Mail Jeevas), in the anime Death Note
Matt Jensen, a character in the Netflix series 13 Reasons Why
Matt Murdock, secret identity of the Marvel Comics Earth-616 superhero Daredevil
Matt Murdock, secret identity of the Marvel Comics Earth-65 supervillain Kingpin
Matt Oleander, in Degrassi: The Next Generation
Matt Robinson (Neighbours), in the Australian soap opera Neighbours
Matt Ishida, Digimon Adventure
Matthew "Matt" Taylor, one of eight protagonists from the survival horror game Until Dawn
Matt Trakker, a character from the cartoon M.A.S.K. (TV series)
Matt, main character in Cyberchase
Matt Holt, older brother of Pidge from Voltron: Legendary Defender
Matt, a character in the internet series Eddsworld
Matt, a non-playable Mii opponent in the Wii series
Matthew (Matt) Freeman, a character in Anthony Horowitz's The Power of Five Series. He is the main protagonist in Raven's Gate and Evil Star, one of the main characters in Necropolis and Oblivion, and appears briefly in Nightrise.
Mat, The tall, slimmer and red shirted character from a czech series Pat & Mat
Officer Matt Parkman, a character from the tv show Heroes

Surname 
 Albert Edward Matt, British composer, Grand March: Fame and Glory (Op. 21)
 Francis Xavier Matt, German-American immigrant and founder of Matt Brewing Company
 Jamille Matt (born 1990), Jamaican footballer
 Patrick Matt (born 1969), Liechtenstein track cyclist
 Richard Matt (1966–2015), American convicted murderer and prison escapee

See also
 Maat (disambiguation)
 MAT (disambiguation)
 Matt (disambiguation)
 Matte (disambiguation)
 Matthew (name)

 

English masculine given names
Hypocorisms
Surnames from given names